Mormosaurus ("Mormo's Lizard") is an extinct genus of tapinocephalid dinocephalian therapsid from the Guadalupian epoch of South Africa. It was first named by Watson in 1914, and contains one species, M. seeleyi. Members of Mormosaurus had a long skull. Its taxonomic status is not settled, as some authorities synonymize it with Keratocephalus.

See also

 List of therapsids

References
 
 The Osteology of the Reptiles by Alfred Sherwood Romer

External links
 Mormosaurus in the Paleobiology Database
 www.paleofile.com - Alphabetical list, section M

Tapinocephalians
Prehistoric therapsid genera
Fossil taxa described in 1914
Taxa named by D. M. S. Watson